The Sheffield Botanical Gardens are botanical gardens situated off Ecclesall Road in Sheffield, England, with 5,000 species of plants in 19 acres (77,000 m2) of land.

The gardens were designed by Robert Marnock and first opened in 1836.  The most notable feature of the gardens are the Grade II* listed glass pavilions, restored and reopened in 2003. Other notable structures are the main gateway, the south entrance lodge and a bear pit containing an 8' tall steel statue of an American Black Bear called Robert the Bear. In the rose garden is a bronze sculpture "Pan: Spirit of the Wood", a gift in 1934 from Sir Charles Clifford, owner of the Sheffield Telegraph and Star, to the city. The sculptor is not known.

The Sheffield Botanical and Horticultural Society was formed in 1833 and by 1834 had obtained £7,500 in funding. Sheffield's Town Trust assumed the management of the gardens in the closing years of the 19th. century, when they repaid the shareholders the nominal value of their £5 shares. The Trust abolished the existing entry charge and since that time entry to the Botanical Gardens has remained free. Though the Town Trust are still the owners, Sheffield Corporation signed a 99-year lease on 18 December 1951, thereby taking over management.

The gardens hold the national collection of the genus Sarcococca, Weigela and the closely related Diervilla.

References

Sheffield Botanical Gardens: People, Plants & Pavilions. R.A. Hunter 2007

External links
Sheffield Botanical Gardens website
Friends of the Botanical Gardens, Sheffield FOBS) website

Botanical gardens in Yorkshire
Grade II listed buildings in Sheffield
Botanical Gardens
Gardens in South Yorkshire
Parks in Sheffield
Grade II listed parks and gardens in South Yorkshire